John Christopher Grant Jr. (born November 7, 1974) is a Hall of Fame professional lacrosse player who has played in Major League Lacrosse, the National Lacrosse League, and the Ontario Lacrosse Association. Grant Jr. was named men's lacrosse Offensive Coordinator at Johns Hopkins in 2020 and resigned after two seasons.

Personal
Grant is the son of John Grant Sr., a former star in the Ontario Lacrosse Association and the original Philadelphia Wings. Grant Jr., known as Junior, has a physical education degree from the University of Delaware.  He is married to Raygen Rogers and has one daughter, Gabrayel Grant, born in 2010.

OLA career
Grant began his Ontario Lacrosse Association career with the Peterborough Lakers in the OLA Junior A Lacrosse League.  He was named the OLA Junior A Lacrosse League Most Valuable Player in 1994, and was the league's top scorer in 1993, 1994, and 1995.  In 1995, Grant moved up to the Major Series Lacrosse (MSL) with the Peterborough Lakers, where he won the Top Rookie of the Year award.  In 2000, Grant won the MSL Most Valuable Player award.  In 2002 and 2003, Grant moved west, playing in the Western Lacrosse Association with the Coquitlam Adanacs, earning All-Star recognition.

Grant came back to the Peterborough Lakers in 2004 and led the team to a Mann Cup victory, earning the Mike Kelley Memorial Trophy as the competition's Most Valuable Player.  In 2006 and 2007, Grant again won the Mann Cup as a member of the Lakers, earning his second Mann Cup MVP in 2007.

Grant suited up for the Peterborough Lakers of Major Series Lacrosse on July 9, 2009, a surprisingly early comeback from his surgery. In 2010, Grant and the Peterborough Lakers won the Mann Cup once again, beating out the New Westminster Salmonbellies.

College career
Grant was drafted by the Buffalo Bandits in 1995, but he didn't sign, instead opting to attend college at SUNY Morrisville, where he stayed for two years, playing for future Yale coach Andy Shay. Grant transferred to the University of Delaware and played the 1998 and 1999 seasons, again teaming up with Shay who had moved there as an assistant, with the Fightin' Blue Hens compiling a 23 and 8 during that time. Grant made the USILA All-American team his junior season, but really attracted national attention his senior year.

In 1999, Grant had 56 goals and 54 assists for 110 points, leading the nation in assists and points and setting school records for both categories. He was named the USILA National Collegiate Player of the Year and was awarded the Jack Turnbull Award as National Attackman of the Year. Grant was Delaware's first USILA First Team All-American. John led the school to its first ever NCAA quarterfinal appearance as well as its first 14-win season, with victories over perennial lacrosse powers North Carolina, Navy and Towson, in addition to 4 other top 20 teams.

Grant's 110-point 1999 season currently ranks tenth on the NCAA Individual Single-Season Leaders list and Grant is 13th in career points per game. He was the last Division I player to average more than 6 points-per-game for an entire season (1999), until Lyle Thompson did this in 2013.

In 2010, Grant was inducted into the NJCAA Lacrosse Hall of Fame.

NLL career
Grant was drafted by the Buffalo Bandits in the third round of the 1995 MILL Entry Draft. He was never signed by the Bandits, opting instead to attend college, re-entered the draft four years later when he was drafted first overall by the Rochester Knighthawks in the 1999 NLL Entry Draft, and was named NLL Rookie of the Year for the 2000 season. He holds several franchise records including most goals (347) and most points (719). Grant is also tied for fifth all-time in goals, third in assists per game and 12th in points in NLL history. He has some of the team's single-season records too, including: Most goals (54), most assists (60), and most points (111). Grant is also the team's all-time leader in playoff goals (47) and points (82).

In 2007 Grant set a National Lacrosse League record with 15 points in a single game (9 goals, 6 assists) in a win over the New York Titans, since broken by Mark Steenhuis. He was recognized with Overall Player of the Week Honors for his record-breaking achievement. After the regular season, Grant was named the 2007 NLL MVP, and then on May 12, 2007, Grant capped off his extraordinary season by being named Champion's Cup game MVP, as the Knighthawks defeated the Arizona Sting 13–11 to win their second championship.  On May 25, 2007, Rochester Mayor Robert Duffy awarded Grant the Key to the City in recognition of the Knighthawks' championship.

Grant missed the entire 2009 season after having emergency surgery to remove an infection in his knee. In 2010, Grant returned to form playing in 15 of his team's 16 games, though Rochester missed the playoffs.

On October 27, 2010, Grant (plus defender Mac Allen) was traded to the Colorado Mammoth in exchange for 2010 NLL Goaltender of the Year Matt Vinc, plus transition players Matt Zash and Brad Self.  Draft picks were also exchanged in the trade, which the Knighthawks said they executed to alleviate the effects of an aging roster, despite being reluctant to deal Grant after such a long and successful tenure in Rochester.

After a strong debut season with the Mammoth in which he scored 83 points (matching his 2010 total), Grant had one of the best years of his career in 2012. He scored his 1000th career point in January and his 500th career goal in March, set a new NLL record with 116 points in a season, and was named MVP for the second time in his career.

MLL career
He played for the Rochester Rattlers in their inaugural season in 2001, and finished second in the league with 59 points (41 goals, 3 two-pointers, 15 assists) in 14 games. He was also named an MLL All-Star and earned league Offensive Player of the Year honors. After not playing in the league from 2002 through 2004, he returned to the Rattlers for the 2005 season.  In 2007,  Grant broke the league's single-season points record with 71 points, was named Offensive Player of the Year for the second time, and was awarded the Major League Lacrosse MVP Award. In 2008, Grant led the league in scoring with 64 points (47 goals, 4 two-pointers, 13 assists) and was named the 2008 Bud Light Major League Lacrosse Most Valuable Player for the second year in a row. Grant and the Rattlers went on to win the MLL Championship in 2008, with a 16 to 6 defeat of Denver. This was the first MLL title for the Rattlers.

He, along with the rest of the Rattlers franchise and roster, transferred to the Toronto (later Hamilton) Nationals when the franchise was bought by a new ownership group in 2009.

On June 14, 2011, it was announced that Grant Jr was traded to the Long Island Lizards for a second-round draft pick in the 2012 Collegiate draft, which would become a 4th-round pick if Grant Jr does not report.  Nationals general manager Jody Gage—the same GM who traded Grant away from the Knighthawks—cited a desire to go with a younger roster as a factor in the trade decision.

In February 2012, Grant Jr was traded to the Chesapeake Bayhawks.

Grant Jr. was traded to the Denver Outlaws, along with defenseman Michael Simon, in exchange for attackman Brendan Mundorf and the 16th pick in the 2014 collegiate draft in September 2013. He spent two-and-a-half seasons with the Outlaws before being traded to his sixth team, the Ohio Machine, in June 2016 following a 2–6 start to the Outlaws' season. In the Machine's final game of the regular season, Grant Jr. scored ten goals in a huge victory over the New York Lizards, clinching a playoff berth for the Machine and becoming the first MLL player to score 10 goals in a game. Grant Jr. helped the Machine get to their first championship game that summer, but faced his former team in the Denver Outlaws, who had rattled off seven straight victories. The Machine surrendered a huge lead and Grant Jr. lost his first championship game, 19–18 in a weather-delayed game. Grant Jr., at 42, announced his retirement from the league on April 19, 2017.

Return from retirement
John Grant Jr. announced on May 27, 2019, that he would return to the playing field for the Denver Outlaws. He had already spent the last two years as an assistant coach for the Outlaws, but would step into a player-coach role for the 2019 summer. At 44, Grant Jr. would become by far the oldest active player in Major League Lacrosse. He entered the season only needing five points to surpass Paul Rabil as the all-time leading scorer in MLL history. He hit this mark on June 9 in an 18–16 win over the Atlanta Blaze

On July 9, the league announced the 44-year-old John Grant Jr. had been selected to the MLL All Star Game. As of July 9, Grant Jr. was 11th in the league in points (18) with 10 goals and eight assists.

Professional Lacrosse Hall of Fame
On June 18, 2022, Grant was inducted into the Professional Lacrosse Hall of Fame as one of the eleven members of the inaugural class of inductees.

Coaching career
Grant has served as player-coach for the Denver Outlaws of Major League Lacrosse.
He was named men's lacrosse Offensive Coordinator at Johns Hopkins in 2020 and resigned in 2022 to "pursue other opportunities in the lacrosse world.

International lacrosse career
In 2006, Grant and Gary Gait led the Canadian national lacrosse team to an historic victory in the 2006 World Lacrosse Championship over the United States, 15–10. Grant led the tournament in points and assists and was selected for the All-World team. He has also represented Team Canada in the following events:

1998 World Lacrosse Championship, silver medal
2002 Heritage Cup, silver medal 
2002 World Lacrosse Championship, silver medal
2003 World Indoor Lacrosse Championship, gold medal
2004 Heritage Cup, gold medal
2006 World Lacrosse Championship, gold medal
2007 World Indoor Lacrosse Championship, gold medal
2010 World Lacrosse Championships, silver medal
2011 World Indoor Lacrosse Championship, gold medal

Accomplishments

 1994 OLA Junior A Most Valuable Player
 1995 MSL Rookie of the Year
 1999 USILA National Collegiate Player of the Year
 1999 National Collegiate Attackman of the Year
 2000 NLL Rookie of the Year
 2000 MSL Most Valuable Player
 2001 MLL Offensive Player of the Year
 2003 World Indoor Lacrosse Championship Champions (Canada)
 2004 Heritage Cup Champions (Canada)
 2004 Mann Cup Champions (Peterborough Lakers)
 2004 Mann Cup Most Valuable Player
 2006 World Lacrosse Championship Champions (Canada)
 2006 World Lacrosse Championship- All World Team
 2006 Mann Cup Champion (Peterborough Lakers)
 2007 NLL Most Valuable Player
 2007 NLL Champions Cup Champion (Rochester Knighthawks)
 2007 NLL Champions Cup Most Valuable Player
 2007 World Lacrosse Championships Champion (Canada)
 2007 MLL Offensive Player of the Year
 2007 MLL Most Valuable Player
 2007 Mann Cup Champion (Peterborough Lakers)
 2007 Mann Cup Most Valuable Player
 2008 MLL Offensive Player of the Year
 2008 MLL Most Valuable Player
 2008 MLL Steinfeld Cup Champion (Rochester Rattlers)
 2009 MLL Steinfeld Cup Champion (Toronto Nationals)
 2010 Mann Cup Champion (Peterborough Lakers)
 2010 World Lacrosse Championship- All World Team (Top Attackman)
 2012 NLL Most Valuable Player
 2012 MLL Steinfeld Cup Champion (Chesapeake Bayhawks)
 2012 Mann Cup Champion (Peterborough Lakers)
 2013 MLL Steinfeld Cup Champion (Chesapeake Bayhawks)
2014  MLL Steinfeld Cup Champion (Denver Outlaws)

Statistics

NLL
Reference:

Major League Lacrosse
Reference:

Canadian Lacrosse Association

University of Delaware

(a) 11th in NCAA Men's Division I Single Season Total Points
(b) 15th in NCAA Men's Division I Career Points-per-Game

1999 Season Game Log

Awards

See also
1999 NCAA Division I Men's Lacrosse Championship
NCAA Men's Division I Lacrosse Records
NLL records
University of Delaware Mens Lacrosse
Division I men's lacrosse records

External links
University Of Delaware 1999 Season
John Grant, Jr.'s Championship Career of Defying the Odds
 John Grant Jr. highlights from UDel team

References

1974 births
Living people
Canadian lacrosse players
Delaware Fightin' Blue Hens men's lacrosse players
Lacrosse people from Ontario
Major League Lacrosse major award winners
Major League Lacrosse players
Morrisville State College alumni
National Lacrosse League All-Stars
National Lacrosse League major award winners
Rochester Knighthawks players
Sportspeople from Peterborough, Ontario
Hamilton Nationals players
Colorado Mammoth players
University of Delaware alumni
Johns Hopkins Blue Jays men's lacrosse coaches